Over the James is the fourth studio album by punk rock band Avail. It was released in 1998 on Lookout! Records. The album was re-released in 2006 by Jade Tree Records.  The re-release contains the songs from Avail's split record with the (Young) Pioneers, as well as two tracks recorded for compilations.

Reception and legacy
Brian Raftery of AllMusic gave Over the James a three star review praising cuts like "Sanctuary 13" and "August" but noting the band's stagnation. Zach Baron of Pitchfork gave the album 7.7 out of 10 praising the album's production, stating: "slicker, slower, longer-- epic, sorta pretentious-- but also the apotheosis of their sound, more or less: All chorus, all the time".

In May 2019, Decibel inducted Over the James into their Hall of Fame, calling it a melodic hardcore classic that was popular among emo and metal fans alike.

Track listing
All tracks by Avail.

2006 Re-Release Bonus Tracks
<li> "Lombardy Street (Acoustic)"
<li> "You May Be Right" (Billy Joel Cover)
<li> "Suspicious Minds" (Elvis Presley Cover)
<li> "Said Gun" (Embrace Cover)

Personnel
 Tim Barry - lead vocals
 Beau Beau Butler - backing vocals
 Joe Banks - guitars
 Justin "Gwomper" Burdick - bass
 Erik Larson - drums

References

Avail albums
1998 albums
Lookout! Records albums